Pia Lucia Baldisserri (born 23 April 1957) is an Italian former sports shooter. She competed in the mixed trap event at the 1988 Summer Olympics.

References

External links
 

1957 births
Living people
Italian female sport shooters
Olympic shooters of Italy
Shooters at the 1988 Summer Olympics
People from Cesena
Sportspeople from the Province of Forlì-Cesena